Mauricio Ezequiel Sperduti (born 16 February 1986, in Rosario, Santa Fe) is an Argentine footballer who plays as a right winger for Oriente Petrolero.

Club career
Nicknamed El Gordo, his debuted in the Argentine Primera División was in 2006 against Gimnasia y Esgrima La Plata.

On January 30, 2013, moved to Serie A club Palermo, signing a contract until 2016. In the Sicilian club finds Mauro Formica, former teammate Newell's Old Boys.

Career statistics

 (*) Includes Copa Libertadores and Copa Sudamericana.

International career
He made his international debut March 16, 2011, against Venezuela in a 4–1 victory. The second appearance comes on 20 April in a 2–2 draw against Ecuador.

References

External links
 
 Argentine Primera statistics at Fútbol XXI 

1986 births
Living people
Footballers from Rosario, Santa Fe
Argentine footballers
Argentine Primera División players
Paraguayan Primera División players
Newell's Old Boys footballers
Arsenal de Sarandí footballers
Palermo F.C. players
Cerro Porteño players
Club Atlético Banfield footballers
Club Atlético Patronato footballers
Oriente Petrolero players
Bolivian Primera División players
Argentine expatriate footballers
Expatriate footballers in Paraguay
Association football midfielders